Monty's Hotel or Montgomery Hotel & Bar was established in 1880s at Parklane. The hotel and bar was patronised by British Officers posted in Secunderabad, India. The hotel has gothic traceried windows, steep pitched roofs with wooden bracings and an imposing European facade.

Monty's Bar is a local landmark. Presently only the bar is functional. Monty's Hotel was declared as Grade IIb heritage structure by HUDA.

Presently, the hotel is in a dilapidated condition and poorly maintained. There was a proposal in 2009 by state government to delist it from the list of Heritage structures and demolish it
. However, this was stayed by AP High Court

References

External links 
 Monty's Memories
 Heritage Monument or Hotel California 

Heritage structures in Hyderabad, India
Restaurants in Hyderabad, India
1880 establishments in India
Restaurants established in 1880